Harry Golombek OBE (1 March 1911 – 7 January 1995) was a British chess player, chess author, and wartime codebreaker. He was three times British chess champion, in 1947, 1949, and 1955 and finished second in 1948.

Biography
He was born in Lambeth to Polish-Jewish parents. He was the chess correspondent of the newspaper The Times from 1945 to 1985, after Stuart Milner-Barry. He was an FIDE official, and served as arbiter for several important events, including the Candidates' Tournament of 1959 in Yugoslavia, and the 1963 World Chess Championship match between Mikhail Botvinnik and Tigran Petrosian. He also edited the game collections of Capablanca and Réti, and was a respected author. He was editor of British Chess Magazine from 1938 to 1940, and its overseas editor in the 1960s and 1970s. Golombek also translated several chess books from Russian into English.

On the outbreak of World War II in September 1939, Golombek was in Buenos Aires, Argentina, competing in the Chess Olympiad for Britain alongside C. H. O'D. Alexander and Stuart Milner-Barry. They immediately returned to the UK, and were soon recruited into Bletchley Park, the wartime codebreaking centre. Golombek worked in Hut 8, the section responsible for solving German Naval Enigma, moving to another section in October/November 1942. After the war he lived at 35 Albion Crescent, Chalfont St Giles. He was unusual among public figures in replying with care to letters from unknown people, such as young schoolboys, from this address.

Golombek represented England nine times in the Chess Olympiad. He earned the title of International Master in 1950 and was awarded that of Honorary Grandmaster in 1985. He was the first British player to qualify for an Interzonal tournament.

Golombek studied philology at King's College London, having been a pupil at Wilson's Grammar School, Camberwell. He was appointed OBE in 1966, the first to be so honoured for services to chess.

Golombek died 7 January 1995.

Books

 The World Chess Championship 1948, 1948, David McKay Company
 World Chess Championship 1954, 1954, MacGibbon and Kee
 Reti's Best Games of Chess, 1954, G. Bell & Sons, Ltd, republished 1974 (Dover Publications, Inc.)
 The Game of Chess, 1954, Penguin Books
 The World Chess Championship 1957, 1957, MacGibbon and Kee
 Instructions to Young Chess Players, 1958, Pitman Publishing 
 Modern Opening Chess Strategy, 1959, Pitman Publishing
 4th Candidates Tournament 1959: Bled, Zagreb, Belgrade (originally BCM Quarterly No.3), 1960, BCM
 Capablanca's Hundred Best Games of Chess, 1947, G. Bell and Sons
 Fischer v Spassky: The World Chess Championship 1972, 1973, Times Newspapers 
 A History of Chess, 1976, Routledge & Kegan Paul, 
 Improve Your Chess, 1976, Pitman Publishing
 The Best Games of CHO'D Alexander (co-authored with William Hartston), 1976, Oxford University Press
 Golombek's Encyclopedia of Chess (Golombek as editor-in-chief) 1977, Batsford 
 Beginning Chess, 1981, Penguin Books

References

External links
 
 
 
 Translated Penguin Book – at Penguin First Editions reference site of early first edition Penguin Books.
 "Harry Golombek (1911-95)" by Edward Winter

1911 births
1995 deaths
Chess grandmasters
Chess Olympiad competitors
British chess players
Bletchley Park people
British non-fiction writers
British chess writers
Jewish chess players
Chess arbiters
Officers of the Order of the British Empire
Sportspeople from London
Alumni of King's College London
People educated at Wilson's School, Wallington
British male writers
20th-century chess players
20th-century non-fiction writers
Male non-fiction writers